Frisky may refer to:

 Frisky (automobile) a family of British microcars produced 1957-1964
 Frisky Tom, a 1981 arcade game
 Mister Frisky, a racehorse
 ST Frisky, a tugboat, previously the Empire Rita
 "Frisky" (song), by Tinie Tempah
 Frisky (film), US title for the 1954 Italian film Bread, Love and Jealousy
 Frisky, a 2015 comedy film
 The Frisky (website), a Women's Entertainment & Lifestyle website

See also 
 Friskies, a brand of cat food
 Frisky & Mannish, a musical comedy cabaret double act based in London